This article details the qualifying phase for judo at the 2016 Summer Olympics.  The competition at these Games will comprise a total of 386 athletes coming from their respective NOCs; each has been allowed to enter a maximum of 14 (seven each for both men and women per division). Host nation Brazil has reserved a spot in each of all 14 events, while twenty are made available to NOCs through a Tripartite Commission Invitation.

The remaining judoka must undergo a qualifying process to earn a spot for the Games through the world ranking list prepared by International Judo Federation that begins on May 30, 2014, and then concludes two years later on the same date.

The top 22 men and top 14 women from the world rankings in each division must directly qualify, ensuring that the NOC is subjected to a limit of 1 judoka per division. If an NOC contains more than a single male athlete ranked in the top 22 and a single female in the top 14 of the world ranking list, the NOC can decide which of their athletes obtain the quota places. Further continental quotas (Europe 25, Africa 24, Pan America 21, Asia 20 and Oceania 10 across both sexes and all divisions) are also subjected to an overall limit to one judoka per NOC and two judoka per division from each continent.

Summary

Men's events

Extra-lightweight (60 kg)

Half-lightweight (66 kg)

Lightweight (73 kg)

Half-middleweight (81 kg)

Middleweight (90 kg)

Half-heavyweight (100 kg)

Heavyweight (+100 kg)

Women's events

Extra-lightweight (48 kg)

Half-lightweight (52 kg)

Lightweight (57 kg)

Half-middleweight (63 kg)

Middleweight (70 kg)

Half-heavyweight (78 kg)

Heavyweight (+78 kg)

Notes

References

Qualification for the 2016 Summer Olympics
2016
Olympics, Qualification
Qualification